Morla is a 16 km long river in province of Bergamo.  Its source is located in Maresana in the municipality of Ponteranica, then Morla crosses the city of Bergamo, after Bergamo part of its waters are used in agriculture. One branch flows into the Serio near Orio al Serio.

References 

Tributaries of the Serio
Rivers of the Province of Bergamo
Bergamo
Rivers of Italy